The c-sis internal ribosome entry site (IRES) is a RNA element found in the 5' UTR of the PDGF beta chain gene. The internal ribosome entry site  contains three modules that can individually mediate internal ribosome entry. However, the full length sequence is required for maximal IRES activity. It is thought that the three IRES elements are somehow responsive to cellular changes and act to regulate the level of translation.

References

External links 
 

Cis-regulatory RNA elements